Marcus Karlström (born 6 January 1995) is a Swedish professional ice hockey defenceman. He is currently playing with HV71 of the HockeyAllsvenskan (Allsv). He has formerly played with AIK IF of the Swedish Hockey League (SHL). Karlstrom was selected by the Winnipeg Jets in the 7th round (194th overall) of the 2013 NHL Entry Draft.

Playing career
Karlström made his Swedish Hockey League debut playing a solitary game with AIK during the 2013–14 SHL season.

During the 2018–19 season, Karlström transferred from Tingsryds AIF to Södertälje SK, later securing a two-year contract on January 8, 2019.

Career statistics

References

External links

1995 births
Living people
AIK IF players
Almtuna IS players
HV71 players
Mora IK players
Södertälje SK players
Swedish ice hockey defencemen
Tingsryds AIF players
Winnipeg Jets draft picks